Çayağzı, also known as Cemele, is a village in the central (Kırşehir) district of Kırşehir Province, Turkey.

External links
Village website

Villages in Kırşehir District